Maxwelton is an unincorporated community in Greenbrier County, West Virginia, United States. Maxwelton has a post office with ZIP code 24957.

A former variant name was Hattie.

The Greenbrier Valley Airport is located in Maxwelton.

References

Unincorporated communities in Greenbrier County, West Virginia
Unincorporated communities in West Virginia